The history of German journalism dates to the 16th century. Germany invented printing, and produced its first newspapers in the 16th century. However, Germany was divided into so many competing states that before unification in 1871, no newspaper played a dominant role.

Early developments
Merchants in early modern Europe exchanged financial and commercial news, and some started regular newsletters for their clients. One example of this type of merchant was the 16th-century German financiar, Fugger. He not only received business news from his correspondents, but also sensationalist and gossip news as well. It is evident in Fugger's correspondence with his network that fiction and fact were both significant parts of early news publications.  16th century Germany also saw subscription-based, handwritten news. Those who subscribed to these publications were generally low-level government officials and also merchants. They could not afford other types of news publications, but had enough money to pay for a subscription, which was still expensive for the time.

In the 16th and 17th century, there appeared numerous printed news sheets summarizing accounts of battles, treaties, kings, epidemics, and special events. Early forms of news periodicals were the so-called Messrelationen ("trade fair reports") which were compiled twice a year, for the large book fairs in Frankfurt and Leipzig respectively, starting in the 1580s. In 1609 Johann Carolus published the first short-interval regular newspaper in Strasbourg, comprising brief news bulletins. By the 1620s, numerous major cities had newspapers of 4 to 8 pages appearing at irregular intervals; all were strictly censored. The first daily newspaper appeared in 1660 in Leipzig. Prussia increasingly became the largest and most dominant of the German states, but it had weak newspapers that were kept under very tight control. Advertising was forbidden, and budgets were very small.

The term newspaper became common in the 17th century. However, in Germany, publications that we would today consider to be newspaper publications, were appearing as early as the 16th century. They were discernibly newspapers for the following reasons: they were printed, dated, appeared at regular and frequent publication intervals, and included a variety of news items (unlike single item news mentioned above). The first newspaper according to modern definitions was the Strasbourg Relation, in the early 17th century. German newspapers, like avisis, were organized by the location from which they came, and by date. They differed from avisis in that they employed a distinct and highly illustrated title page, and they applied an overall date to each issue.

The emergence of the new media branch was based on the spread of the printing press from which the publishing press derives its name. Historian Johannes Weber says, "At the same time, then, as the printing press in the physical, technological sense was invented, 'the press' in the extended sense of the word also entered the historical stage. The phenomenon of publishing was born. The German-language Relation aller Fürnemmen und gedenckwürdigen Historien, printed from 1605 onwards by Johann Carolus in Strasbourg, was the first newspaper.

German Confederation, 1815–1867

A large number of newspapers and magazines flourished. A typical small city had one or two newspapers; Berlin and Leipzig had dozens. The audience was limited to perhaps five percent of the adult men, chiefly from the aristocratic and middle classes, who followed politics. Liberal papers outnumbered conservative ones by a wide margin. Foreign governments bribed editors to guarantee a favorable image. Censorship was strict, and the government issued the political news they were supposed to report. After 1871, strict press laws were used by Bismarck to shut down the Socialist, and to threaten hostile editors. There were no national newspapers. Editors focused on political commentary, but also included a nonpolitical cultural page, focused on the arts and high culture. Especially popular was the serialized novel, with a new chapter every week. Magazines were politically more influential, and attracted the leading intellectuals as authors.

Weimar Republic 
The republic's constitution along with other social forces and the earlier Reich press law of 1874 gave rise to a dispersed, energetic and pluralistic press with a wide range of political opinion after the Great War. The  and the  established consumer bases decades earlier. Wire news service and newspaper commercial lending by Ruhr industrial interests sought to influence editorial opinion prior to the Great War and during the republic.

1945–1990
In 1945 the occupying powers took over all newspapers in Germany and purged them of Nazi influence. The American occupation headquarters, the Office of Military Government, United States (OMGUS) began its own newspaper based in Munich, Die Neue Zeitung. It was edited by German and Jewish émigrés who fled to the United States before the war. Its mission was to encourage democracy by exposing Germans to how American culture operated. The paper was filled with details on American sports, politics, business, Hollywood, and fashions, as well as international affairs.

See also
 History of journalism
 Magazines
 Newspapers

Notes

Further reading
 Broersma, Marcel Jeroen, ed. Form and style in journalism: European newspapers and the presentation of news, 1880-2005 (Peeters, 2007).
 Bösch, Frank. Mass Media and Historical Change: Germany in International Perspective, 1400 to the Present (Berghahn, 2015). 212 pp. online review

 Eksteins, Modris.  The Limits of Reason: the German Democratic Press and the Collapse of Weimar Democracy . (Oxford University Press, 1975).
 Espejo, Carmen. "European Communication Networks in the Early Modern Age: A new framework of interpretation for the birth of journalism," Media History (2011) 17#2 pp. 189–202
 Esser, Frank. "Tabloidization'of News A Comparative Analysis of Anglo-American and German Press Journalism." European journal of communication 14.3 (1999): 291–324.
 Hale, Oron James. Publicity and Diplomacy: With Special Reference to England and Germany, 1890-1914 (1940) online
 Lang, Rainhart, and Irma Rybnikova. "Discursive constructions of women managers in German mass media in the gender quota debate 2011-2013." Gender in Management: An International Journal 31#5/6 (2016).
 Magin, Melanie, and Birgit Stark. "Explaining National Differences of Tabloidisation between Germany and Austria: Structure, Conduct and Performance." Journalism Studies 16.4 (2015): 577–595.
 Olson, Kenneth E.  The history makers: The press of Europe from its beginnings through 1965 (LSU Press, 1966) pp. 99–134.
 Sterling, Christopher H., ed. Encyclopedia of Journalism (6 vol. 2009) table of contents
 Wilke, Jürgen, and Carsten Reinemann. "Do the candidates matter? Long-term trends of campaign coverage-a study of the German press since 1949." European Journal of Communication 16.3 (2001): 291–314.

Newspapers and magazines
Magazine publishing
Newspaper publishing

Journalism in Germany